Thomas Allan may refer to:
Thomas Allan (mineralogist) (1777–1833), Scottish mineralogist
Thomas Allan (Scottish footballer), Scottish footballer
Thomas Allan (footballer, born 1999), English footballer
Thomas Allan (publisher) (1832–1894), English collector of songs and music publisher
Tom Allan (footballer) (born 1994), English footballer
Tom Allan (minister) (1916–1965), Scottish minister of the Church of Scotland
Thomas Allan (politician) (1725–1798), Irish politician
Thomas J. Allan (1940–1966), British radio engineer in Antarctica

See also
Thomas Allen (disambiguation)